The birthplace of Anton Chekhov is the place in Taganrog, Russia, where the famous writer Anton Chekhov was born. It is now a writer's house museum. The outbuilding on the territory of a property on Chekhov Street (formerly Kupecheskaya Street, later Alexandrovskaya Street, and renamed in honor of Chekhov in 1904, soon after his death) in Taganrog was built in 1859 of wattle and daub, plastered and whitened. The area taken up by the small outbuilding is 30.5 sq. meters. The house and grounds were owned by the merchant Gnutov in 1860, and by the petit bourgeois Kovalenko in 1880–1915.

Pavel Yegorovich Chekhov and his family (his wife Yevgeniya Yakovlevna and their two sons—four-year-old Alexander Chekhov and 2-year-old Nikolay Chekhov)—rented the outbuilding in December 1859. Anton Chekhov was born in this house on January 17, 1860. In March, 1861, Pavel Yegorovich Chekhov and his family moved into another apartment.

In 1910, a memorial plate was placed on the house of Chekhov thanks to the initiative of the Chekhov Circle in Taganrog, formed by the writer Yevgeny Garshin in 1905. In 1916, the Taganrog City Council supported the initiative of the Chekhov Circle and acquired the house and grounds on Chekhov Street 69 to conserve the house of Anton Chekhov. In December 1920, the house was freed from all tenants, and a renovation followed in 1921. In 1924, the first exhibition telling of the writer's youth was opened.

In 1935 Maria Chekhova and Olga Knipper came to visit the home city of Chekhov, Taganrog, to participate at the events commemorating the 75th anniversary of Anton Chekhov's birth. Within the framework of the visit, Maria Chekhova presented to the Taganrog memorial museum several Anton Chekhov or Chekhov family memorabilia from White Dacha in Yalta.

As part of the celebrations marking the 150th anniversary of Chekhov's birth, Russian President Dmitri Medvedev visited the House memorial museum on January 29, 2010.

Photos

References
 Taganrog Encyclopedia (Энциклопедия Таганрога), 2nd edition, Taganrog, 2003

See also
 Anton Chekhov's White Dacha in Yalta

Museums in Taganrog
Houses completed in 1859
Chekhov, Anton
Anton Chekhov
Historic house museums in Russia
Chekhov
Cultural heritage monuments of federal significance in Rostov Oblast
Cultural heritage monuments in Taganrog